The Fortune Most Powerful Women is a list put out annually by Fortune magazine since 1998. At first, it was as a cover package in 1998 with a simple idea that women were gaining significant power in the corporate world. The list selected women leaders in business, philanthropy, government, education, and the arts. The list has become a community, with live events and programs.

Lists
 2021 Most Powerful Women (US)
 2021 Most Powerful Women International
 2020 Most Powerful Women (US)
 2020 Most Powerful Women International
 2019 Most Powerful Women (US)
 2019 Most Powerful Women International
 2018 Most Powerful Women (US)
 2018 Most Powerful Women International
 2017 Most Powerful Women (US)
 2017 Most Powerful Women International
 2016 Most Powerful Women (US)
 2016 Most Powerful Women International
 2015 Most Powerful Women
 2014 Most Powerful Women
 2013 Most Powerful Women

See also

Female entrepreneurs
40 Under 40
Fortune Global 500
Fortune India 500
Forbes Global 2000
List of largest companies by revenue

References

External links 
CNN Money: Fortune Most Powerful Women
Fortune's Most Powerful International Women
Fortune Most Powerful Women Entrepreneurs 2009-2013
Fortune: The 2013 Most Powerful Women Entrepreneurs
Fortune: The 2013 Most Powerful Women Entrepreneurs video

Fortune (magazine)
Top people lists
Annual magazine issues
Businesswomen